The 1994 Budapest mayoral election was held on 11 December 1994 and was the first direct election to elect the Mayor of Budapest (főpolgármester). On the same day, local elections were held throughout Hungary, including the districts of Budapest. The election was run using a First-past-the-post voting system. The winner of this election served for 4 years.

The election was won by the incumbent, Gábor Demszky.

Results

References 

1994 in Hungary
1994 elections in Europe
Local elections in Hungary
History of Budapest